Alison Pace is an American novelist. She lives in New York City.

Bibliography
According to  WorldCat, she has published the following books:

If Andy Warhol had a Girlfriend 2005
Pug Hill 2006 
Through Thick and Thin  2007 
City Dog 2008
A Pug's Tale 2011

References

External links

https://web.archive.org/web/20120118130907/http://gothamist.com/2007/08/08/alison_pace_nov.php

Living people
21st-century American novelists
American women novelists
Writers from New York City
American women essayists
21st-century American women writers
21st-century American essayists
Novelists from New York (state)
Year of birth missing (living people)